Xijiao is a subdistrict in the Meijiang District of Meizhou City, Guangdong Province, southern China.

References 

Township-level divisions of Guangdong
Meizhou
Subdistricts of the People's Republic of China